Monmouth is a town in Wales.

Monmouth may also refer to:

Places
 Monmouth County (disambiguation)

United Kingdom
 Monmouth (Senedd constituency), of the National Assembly for Wales
 Monmouth (UK Parliament constituency)
 Monmouth School for Boys, an independent boys' school in Monmouth, Wales
 Monmouth Street
 Monmouthshire (disambiguation)

United States
 Monmouth (Natchez, Mississippi), a historic home
 Monmouth, California
 Monmouth, Illinois
 Monmouth, Indiana
 Monmouth, Iowa
 Monmouth, Kansas
 Monmouth, Maine
 Monmouth, Oregon
 Monmouth Academy (Maine)
 Monmouth Academy (New Jersey)
 Monmouth Beach, New Jersey
 Monmouth College, in Monmouth, Illinois
 Monmouth Township (disambiguation)
 Monmouth University, formerly Monmouth College, located in West Long Branch, New Jersey
 Fort Monmouth, a former United States Army post commemorating the 1778 battle

Australia
Monmouth Land District, Tasmania
Electoral district of Monmouth, Tasmania
Electoral division of Monmouth, Tasmania

Canada
 Monmouth Mountain, or Mount Monmouth, in British Columbia

People
Geoffrey of Monmouth (c. 1095–c. 1155), wrote Historia Regum Britanniae (History of the Kings of Britain)
Thomas of Monmouth, 12th-century Benedictine monk
James Scott, 1st Duke of Monmouth (1649–1685), illegitimate son of Charles II
 Earl of Monmouth, a title created twice in the Peerage of England

Other uses
 HMS Monmouth, the name of several ships

See also 

 Monmouth Rebellion, 1685, an attempt to overthrow James II
 Battle of Monmouth, 1778, in the American Revolutionary War
 Battle of Monmouth (1233), Wales
 Monmouthshire (disambiguation)